The Ministry of Internal Affairs of the Republic of Serbia (abbr. MUP) or the Ministry of Interior, is a cabinet-level ministry in the Government of Serbia.

The Ministry is responsible for local and national Police services with municipal and district branches throughout the country. Its core responsibilities include: crime prevention, criminal apprehension, investigations, customs and border control, counter-terrorism, anti-corruption, anti-narcotics and disaster relief. The ministry is also responsible for issuing passports and personal identification to citizens.

The current minister is Bratislav Gašić, in office since 26 October 2022. As of August 2016, the Ministry of Internal Affairs has a total of 42,817 employees, of whom 28,266 are uniformed officers. Of those, 70.2% have secondary education, while 27.8% have higher or high education.

Organization
 Minister of Interior
 Ministers cabinet:
 Bureau for strategic planning
 Bureau for international cooperation and European integration
 Bureau for complaints and representations
 Bureau for cooperation with the media
 Service of internal control
 Secretary of state
 Secretariat:
 Department for normative-legal and general legal affairs
 Department of normative-legal affairs
 Department of general-legal affairs
 Department of housing
 Directorate of police:
 Crime investigation police department
 Police department
 Department for Security
 Unit for protections
 Traffic police department
 Border police department
 Department for administrative affairs
 Operations center
 Department for analytics
 Department of information technology
 Department of connection and cryptography
 Coordination department for Kosovo and Metohija
 Regional police departments
 Finance, human resources and Joint Affairs Sector:
 Department of human resources
 Department for joint affairs
 Department for nutrition & accommodations
 Department for professional education training, development and science
 Internal police control sector
 Sector for search and rescue

Special police units
 Gendarmery
 Special Anti-Terrorist Unit
 Helicopter unit
 Police Brigade

List of ministers

Ministers of Internal Affairs (1944–1991)
 Milentije Popović (1944–1946)
 Slobodan Penezić (1946–1953)
 Vojin Lukić (1953–1962)
 Vladan Bojanić (1962–1963)
 Milisav Lukić (1963–1965)
 Životije Srba Savić (1965–1966)
 Slavko Zečević (1966–1976)
 Viobran Stanojević (1976–1982)
 Svetomir Lalović (1982–1989)
 Radmilo Bogdanović (1989–1991)

Ministers of Internal Affairs (1991–present)
Political Party:

See also

 Ministry of Home Affairs
 Politics of Serbia

References

External links
  

 
Interior
1991 establishments in Serbia
Ministries established in 1991
Serbia